The EL Special, also known as the EL-Ford Special, Ford Ardun Special, or the Ford V8 Special, is a special custom-built open-wheel race car, designed and developed by Erik Lundgren, essentially built as a Formula Libre car, competing in a number of different motorsport disciplines, including open-wheel racing and sports car racing. It was originally built in 1950, but competed up until 1958. It was itself based on a Ford Anglia chassis, but was powered by a Ford flathead V8 engine, and used an aluminum body. It competed in a number of non-championship Formula Two and Formula One racing events, including an unsuccessful entry at the 1951 German Grand Prix, with Lundgren withdrawing before the practice session for the race.

References

Sports racing cars
1950s cars
Cars of Sweden
Open wheel racing cars
Cars introduced in 1950
Formula One cars
Formula Two cars